The Tipsport Kaufland Cup is the national ice hockey cup competition in the Slovakia. It was first played in 2020.

Previous winners
 2020 – HK Nitra

References

External links
Tipsport Kaufland Cup on eurohockey.com

 
Slovak
Ice hockey competitions in Slovakia